Alycia Marlene Parks (born December 31, 2000) is an American tennis player.
She has career-high WTA rankings of world No. 50 in singles achieved on February 27, 2023 and No. 43 in doubles, achieved on February 13, 2023.

Career

2021: WTA Tour & Grand Slam debut, fastest serve record
She made her WTA Tour main-draw debut at the 2021 MUSC Health Open in Charleston, having made it through qualifying as an alternate. She defeated qualifier Grace Min in the first round, before losing to top seed Ons Jabeur in the second.

In her first-round match at the US Open, she tied the record by Venus Williams for the fastest serve by a woman that the tournament had ever recorded (129 mph).

2022: Breakthrough, top-10 win & first doubles title, top 75
In 2022, she made her sixth career main-draw appearance advancing to the second round of the German Open in Berlin as a qualifier. As a result, she climbed to a career-high, up 34 spots from 169 to No. 135, on 20 June 2022.

Ranked No. 144 at the Ostrava Open, she defeated as a qualifier former world No. 1, Karolína Plíšková, for her first top-20 win and followed that by defeating world No. 7 and fourth seed, Maria Sakkari, for her first top-10 win to reach her first ever WTA quarterfinal. At the same tournament in doubles, she won her maiden WTA Tour title, partnering Caty McNally. As a result, she made her top 125 debut in singles and top 100 debut in doubles, at No. 79 on 10 October 2022. 

In December, she reached the top 75 in singles and top 60 in doubles following two back-to-back WTA 125 singles titles and one in doubles.

2023: First WTA title & top-5 win, top 50 in singles & doubles 
As the top seed in the qualifying draw at the 2023 Australian Open, she lost in the second round to Sára Bejlek.
At the same tournament Parks reached the third round in doubles on her debut at this Major, partnering with Oksana Kalashnikova. They lost to eventual champions, Barbora Krejčíková and Katerina Siniaková.

At the Lyon Open she reached her first WTA semifinal defeating Julia Grabher, fourth seeded Petra Martić and seventh seeded Danka Kovinić. She defeated Maryna Zanevska to reach her first WTA final.  Next she defeated top seed Caroline Garcia, recording her first top-5 win, to claim her maiden WTA title. As a result she moved to a new career-high in singles of No. 50 on 27 February 2023.

Performance timeline

Only main-draw results in WTA Tour, Grand Slam tournaments, Fed Cup/Billie Jean King Cup and Olympic Games are included in win–loss records.

Singles
Current after the 2023 Indian Wells Open.

WTA career finals

Singles: 1 (1 title)

Doubles: 1 (title)

WTA Challenger finals

Singles: 2 (2 titles)

Doubles: 2 (2 titles)

ITF Circuit finals

Singles: 6 (1 title, 5 runner-ups)

Doubles: 5 (3 titles, 2 runner-ups)

Head-to-head records

Record against top 10 players
Parks's record against players who have been ranked in the top 10. Active players are in boldface.

Top 10 wins

Notes

References

External links
 
 

2000 births
Living people
American female tennis players
African-American female tennis players
21st-century African-American sportspeople
20th-century African-American sportspeople
20th-century African-American women
21st-century African-American women
Tennis players from Atlanta